Pedro Apellániz Zarraga (8 February 1924 – 22 April 2013) was a Spanish athlete. He competed in the men's javelin throw at the 1948 Summer Olympics.

References

1924 births
2013 deaths
Athletes (track and field) at the 1948 Summer Olympics
Spanish male javelin throwers
Olympic athletes of Spain
People from Galdakao
Mediterranean Games bronze medalists for Spain
Mediterranean Games medalists in athletics
Athletes (track and field) at the 1955 Mediterranean Games
Sportspeople from Biscay
Athletes from the Basque Country (autonomous community)